Ọládélé is both a Yoruba given name or surname meaning "a combination of prestige, success and wealth has come home". Notable people with the name include:

Solomon Oladele, Nigerian footballer
Joseph Oladele Sanusi, Nigerian politician
Oladele Ajose, Nigerian royalty, politician, and health promoter
Oladele Brendon Ayanbadejo, Nigerian American player of American football

Yoruba-language surnames
Yoruba given names